Jacqueline Andrade, also known as Jackie Andrade, FAcSS (born 20th century) is a British psychologist.  She is a professor of psychology in the School of Psychology at the University of Plymouth, located in Plymouth, England.

She finished BA(hons) Psychology from University of Cambridge in 1987 and PhD Psychology from University of Manchester in 1990.

See also
 List of people from Plymouth
 List of women psychologists

References

Year of birth missing (living people)
Place of birth missing (living people)
20th-century births
20th-century British scientists
21st-century British psychologists
Academics of the University of Plymouth
British psychologists
British women scientists
Fellows of the Academy of Social Sciences
Living people
British women psychologists